The  is an electric multiple unit (EMU) train type operated by the Kobe Municipal Subway on the Seishin-Yamate Line since February 16, 2019.

Design and manufacturing 
The trains are manufactured by Kawasaki. The 6000 series will replace the entire fleet of 28 trains on the Seishin-Yamate Line (18 trains comprising the 1000 series, 4 trains comprising the 2000 series, and 6 trains comprising the 3000 series) by 2022, providing a single common fleet of trains for the Seishin-Yamate Line and allowing for the installation of automatic platform gates at every station.

The trains were initially designed by Ken Okuyama Design in 2016.

Interior 
Passenger accommodation consists of longitudinal bench seating throughout, with priority seats being provided at the ends of each car. LED lighting is used in the interiors, and pairs of LCD passenger information screens are provided above the doorways. Although there are gangway connections between each car, they are blocked by openable glass doors.

History 
The first trainsets entered service on February 16, 2019.

As of December 2022, 27 trainsets have been constructed.

References 

Electric multiple units of Japan
Kobe Municipal Subway
Kawasaki multiple units
Train-related introductions in 2019
1500 V DC multiple units of Japan